The Gulf Club Champions Cup, is a football league tournament for the Arabian Peninsula clubs. The 1982 edition was known as the Gulf Cooperation Council Club Tournament. This was the first edition of the competition and featured five nations  from Bahrain, Kuwait, Oman, Qatar and Saudi Arabia. Al-Wasl of the United Arab Emirates withdrew without playing any matches, as many players were selected for the Asian youth championship.

The competition was played between December 1982 and February 1983 on a home and away league format. Al-Arabi of Kuwait were crowned the inaugural champions.

Matches

 

GCC Champions League
Gulf